Events from the year 1969 in North Korea.

Incumbents
Premier: Kim Il-sung 
Supreme Leader: Kim Il-sung

Events
 1969 EC-121 shootdown incident
 End of Korean DMZ Conflict.

Births

 1 December - Choe Chol-su.

See also
Years in Japan
Years in South Korea

References

 
North Korea
1960s in North Korea
Years of the 20th century in North Korea
North Korea